Since the occupation of Afrin by the Syrian National Army and Turkish Armed Forces in March 2018, more than 173 women and girls have been kidnapped, and 109 are still missing; allegations of torture or sexual violence were reported in at least 30 of those cases.

There are grounds to believe that members of Syrian National Army and Turkish Armed Forces committed the war crimes of hostage-taking, torture and cruel, inhuman and degrading treatment, and sexual and gender-based violence, but none have been convicted. 
The report of the Independent International Commission of Inquiry on the Syrian Arab Republic found that, for the purpose of harassment, women and girls were detained by Syrian National Army fighters and subjected to rape and sexual violence, which caused severe physical and psychological harm at both the individual as well as the community levels (para 59). Families from Tell Abyad chose not to return to their homes, fearing rape and sexual violence (para 61). In an apparent effort to humiliate, extract confessions and instill fear in male detainees, Syrian National Army Military Police officers forced them to witness the rape of a minor. One eyewitness recalled that Turkish officials had been present in the facility on the first day (para 60).

Forced disappearance by the Hamza Division

Since 2019, Kurdish women throughout Afrin and Ra's al-Ayn regions have been under threat of kidnapping, torturing and raping by the Syrian national army brigade members, and this caused spreading of fear which in effect confined them to their homes.
Syrian national army held civilians in confidential detention sites, a video footage that widely circulated on 29 May 2020, showed members of Division 22 (the Hamza Brigade) while rushing 8 women to another location. The detainees were 1.Lonjen Abdo; 2. Rojen Abdo; 3.Roshan Amouni; 4.Haifa Al Jasim; 5.Nowruz Abdo; 6.Rokan Munla; 7.Aren Deli; 8.Nadia Suleiman.
Ruken Munla Mohammed was pregnant when she was kidnapped in September 2018 and gave birth in prison. Lonjen and Rojin Mohammed Abdo were among several members of their family to be kidnapped in 2018, it is common for multiple members of the same household to be kidnapped at once.
The Report of the Independent International Commission of Inquiry on the Syrian Arab Republic also states having received reports about forced marriage and abduction of Kurdish women in Afrin, which primarily involved members of Division 24 (the Sultan Murad Brigade) of the Syrian National Army (para 62). The commission also received reports that women belonging to the Yazidi religious minority were detained by Syrian National Army forces and were forced to convert to Islam (para 56).
Confirmed to STJ that the Syrian National Army transferred Syrian prisoners, including women, by Turkish forces to Turkey, which according to the Article 147 of Geneva Convention IV constitutes committing gross violations.

References

Afrin, Syria
War crimes
Syrian National Army
Kurds in Syria
Women's rights in Kurdistan